The 1838 New Hampshire gubernatorial election was held on March 13, 1838.

Incumbent Democratic Governor Isaac Hill defeated Whig nominee James Wilson II with 52.59% of the vote.

General election

Candidates
Isaac Hill, Democratic, incumbent Governor
James Wilson II, Whig, former Speaker of the New Hampshire House of Representatives

Results

Notes

References

1838
New Hampshire
Gubernatorial